was the pen-name of a Japanese novelist and poet active in Shōwa period Japan. His real name was Takami Yoshio.

Early life
Takami was born in Mikuni, Fukui (part of the present-day city of Sakai), as the illegitimate son of the prefecture's governor and a young woman who had been assigned to entertain him on a visit to her town. The famous writer Nagai Kafu was his half-brother.

Literary career
Takami was interested in literature from youth, and was particularly attracted to the humanism expressed by the Shirakaba writers. On entering Tokyo Imperial University he joined a leftist student arts group, and contributed to their literary journal (Sayoku Geijutsu). After graduation, he went to work for Columbia Records, and continued his activities as a Marxist writer, as part of the proletarian literature movement.

In 1932, he was arrested with other communists and suspected members of the Japan Communist Party under the Peace Preservation Laws, and was released six months later after being coerced into recanting his leftist ideology. An auto-biographical account of his experience appeared in Kokyu Wasureubeki ("Should Auld Acquaintance Be Forgot", 1935), which, although considered wordy, was nominated for the first Akutagawa Prize. The theme of ironic self-pity over the weakness that led to his “conversion” and his subsequent intellectual confusion were recurring themes in his future works.

He gained a popular following in the pre-war years with Ikanaru Hoshi no Moto ni ("Under Whatever Star", 1939–1940)., a story set in the Asakusa entertainment district of Tokyo.

During and immediately after World War II, Takami served as Director of the Investigation Bureau of the Japanese Literature Patriotic Association. After the war, he suffered from poor health, but continued to write poetry from his sickbed.

In 1962, Takami helped establish the Museum of Modern Japanese Literature. In 1964, his poetry collection Shi no Fuchi yori ("From the Abyss of Death", 1964) won the Noma Prize. The same year, he also published, Takami Jun Nikki, ("The Diaries of Takami Jun"), an extremely detailed account of over 3000 pages, in which he described his experiences during the war and immediately afterwards.

Takami Jun lived in Kamakura, Kanagawa prefecture from 1943 until his death of esophageal cancer. His grave is at the temple of Tōkei-ji in Kamakura.

Legacy
The Takami Jun Prize was established in 1967 by the Association for the Promotion of Literature by Takami Jun (Takami Jun Bungaku Shinkō Kai) in accordance with his last will and testament. A portion of Takami's royalties was set aside to establish a fund used to present an annual literary award to the writer of an outstanding collection of poetry, based upon the recommendations of poets, critics, and journalists. The winner receives a cash award of 500,000 yen.

His daughter Kyoko is married to professional wrestler and politician Hiroshi Hase.

See also
Japanese literature
List of Japanese authors

References
 Kanbayashi, Michio. Shijin Takami Jun: Sono sei to shi. Kodansha (1991).  (Japanese)
Jang, Hoi Sik. Japanese Imperial Ideology, Shifting War Aims and Domestic Propaganda. (2007) 
 Jun Takami. "School of Trees". http://stihi.ru/2011/05/08/4752 (English)

Notes

1907 births
1965 deaths
Deaths from cancer in Japan
Deaths from esophageal cancer
Japanese communists
Japanese diarists
Japanese Marxists
Marxist writers
Writers from Fukui Prefecture
University of Tokyo alumni
20th-century Japanese novelists
20th-century Japanese poets
20th-century diarists
People from Sakai, Fukui